KNUI (550 kHz) is a commercial AM radio station that broadcasts a Country Music format. Licensed to Wailuku, Hawaii, United States, the station is owned by Pacific Radio Group, Inc.  The studios and offices are on Ano Street in Kahului, Hawaii.

KNUI is powered at 5,000 watts, using a non-directional antenna.  Programming is also heard on FM translator K291CZ at 106.1 MHz in Wailuku.

History
The original call sign was KMVI. It was an affiliate of the CBS Radio Network, carrying its dramas, comedies, variety shows, news and sports during the "Golden Age of Radio." In the 1950s, as network programming moved from radio to television, KMVI had a full service, middle of the road format of popular adult music, news and sports.  

By the 1980s, as most music listening switched from AM to FM radio, KMVI became a talk radio station, known as "The Talk of Maui."  It switched its call sign to KNUI in 2013.  

After three months of being silent, KNUI re-branded as "K-Country" and returned to the air on July 2, 2020. The new station has a playlist of mainstream country artists from different years along with Hawaiian country singers. Additionally, FM translator 106.1 K291CZ was added to compete with rival country station KRYL 106.5 FM.

References

External links
FCC History Cards for KNUI

NUI
Country radio stations in the United States